The 3rd Battlecruiser Squadron was a short-lived Royal Navy squadron of battlecruisers that saw service as part of the Grand Fleet during the First World War.

Creation

The 3rd Battlecruiser Squadron was created in 1915, with the return to home waters of two of the three s— and —following the Battle of the Falkland Islands and the Dardanelles operation. They were joined by their sister , and, under the command of Rear Admiral Sir Horace Hood, the squadron was based at Rosyth, Scotland.

Battle of Jutland
 Invincible - flagship of Rear Admiral the Honourable H. L. A. Hood; Captain A. L. Cay
 Inflexible - Captain E. H. F. Heaton-Ellis
 Indomitable - Captain F. W. Kennedy

On 31 May 1916, the squadron—attached to the Grand Fleet rather than David Beatty's Battlecruiser Fleet—participated in the Battle of Jutland. During the battle, Invincible was hit in her "Q" turret by a salvo from the German battlecruiser , causing a massive explosion. The ship broke in two and sank with the loss of all but six of her crew of 1,021. Admiral Hood was among the dead.

After Jutland
With the loss of Invincible and several other battlecruisers at Jutland, the squadron was no longer required. Indomitable and Inflexible were transferred to the 2nd Battlecruiser Squadron in June 1916.

Rear-Admirals commanding
Post holders included:

References

Sources

External links

Battlecruiser squadrons of the Royal Navy
Military units and formations of the Royal Navy in World War I